This is an overview of the Grahams and a list of them by height. Grahams are defined as Scottish hills between 600 and 762 metres in height, with a minimum prominence, or drop, of 150 metres. The final list of Grahams, with this definition, was published by Alan Dawson in 2022 in the booklet Ten Tables of Grahams: The Official List  and in the book Tales from the Grahams: 231 medium-sized hills of Scotland.    

In November 1992, Fiona Torbet (née Graham) published her own list which did not include the Southern Uplands and had several omissions and inaccuracies. Dawson and Torbet met to discuss the issue and agreed to use Dawson's list but to apply the name Grahams, which they both preferred to Elsies. By definition, all Grahams, given their prominence, are also Marilyns. Alan Dawson devised and compiled the original list of Marilyns, including the hills now known as Grahams, and continues to maintain the official lists. The Scottish Mountaineering Club ("SMC") also uses the list, with permission, including it in the 1997 edition of Munro's Tables and in the subsequent guidebook The Grahams & the Donalds.

When first published in 1992, there were 222 Elsies in Scotland, but this soon increased to 224 with the addition of Beinn Talaidh on Mull (after research by Fiona Torbet) and Ladylea Hill. The revised list of hills known as Grahams was formally published in 1995 and 1999  as part of the TACit Tables series. The list of Grahams remained stable for almost twenty years until Alan Dawson began a programme of accurate hill surveying using GNSS equipment. As a result, in 2014, three Grahams were removed as they were only 609m high (Ben Aslak, Corwharn and Ladylea Hill) and Creag na h-Eararuidh near Glen Artney became a new Graham, replacing Beinn Dearg, which was found to be 1.7 m lower. In 2015 a survey showed that Stob na Boine Druim-fhinn has a drop of only 149.5 m so was no longer a Marilyn or a Graham, then in 2016 Cnoc Coinnich was found to be 763.5 m and therefore too high to be a Graham.

From 2016 to 2022 there were 219 Grahams, until the revised lower threshold of 600 metres resulted in Ben Aslak, Corwharn and Ladylea Hill being reinstated as Grahams, and nine new Grahams added. All but two of the 231 Grahams have been surveyed using GNSS equipment and therefore summit heights are given to the nearest 0.1 m in the official list.

Climbers who climb all of the Grahams are referred to as Grahamists. There is some uncertainty over the first, but it is thought to have been Colin Dodgson in July 1984, followed by Andrew Dempster in June 1997. People who have climbed the 219 Grahams over 2000 feet are still classed as Grahamists, even though the number of Grahams was increased to 231 in November 2022.

Grahams by height (in 2018) 

This list is from the Database of British and Irish Hills ("DoBIH") in October 2018, and are peaks the DoBIH marks as being Grahams ("G").. The DoBIH team updates their database as more survey results are published, so these tables should not be amended or updated unless the entire DoBIH data is re-downloaded again.

Bibliography

DoBIH codes

The DoBIH uses the following codes for the various classifications of mountains and hills in the British Isles, which many of the above peaks also fall into:

See also

List of mountains of the British Isles by height
List of mountains of the British Isles by prominence
Lists of mountains and hills in the British Isles
List of mountains in Ireland
List of Munro mountains in Scotland
List of Murdos (mountains)
List of Furth mountains in the British Isles
List of Marilyns in the British Isles
List of P600 mountains in the British Isles

Notes

Reference

External links
Ten Tables of Grahams: The Official List Final and definitive tables of Grahams, published in November 2022
The Database of British and Irish Hills (DoBIH), the largest database of British Isles mountains
Hill Bagging UK & Ireland, the searchable interface for the DoBIH
The Relative Hills of Britain (rhb.org.uk), a website dedicated to mountain and hill classification
Grahams: Summary of Alan Dawson's work on Grahams

Grahams